Michwacho Lake is a freshwater body crossed by the Chibougamau River, in the southern part of Eeyou Istchee James Bay (municipality), in the administrative region of Nord-du-Québec, in Quebec, Canada.

Michwacho Lake is entirely part of the Township of Opemisca. Forestry is the main economic activity of the sector. Recreational tourism activities come second.

The Michwacho Lake watershed is accessible via a forest road that runs around Lake Normandy and serves the southwest of the lake and the southern part of Mt. Michwacho. This last road is attached to route 113 linking Lebel-sur-Quévillon to Chibougamau.

The surface of Michwacho Lake is usually frozen from early November to mid-May, however, safe ice movement is generally from mid-November to mid-April.

Geography

Toponymy
Formerly, this name has been designated "Mikwasash Lake" and "Wikwasash Lake".

The toponym "Lake Michwacho" was formalized on December 5, 1968, by the Commission de toponymie du Québec when it was created.

Notes and references

See also 

Eeyou Istchee James Bay
Lakes of Nord-du-Québec
Nottaway River drainage basin
Jamésie